Kabi Joydeb Mahavidyalaya, established in 2007, is the general degree college in Ilambazar, Birbhum district. It offers undergraduate courses in arts. It is affiliated to  University of Burdwan. It has a sprawling campus of 7.62 acre, which is lush-green and clustered around with naturally grown trees. The College is rapidly growing with the help of the UGC and the state government and now hosts near about 800 students.

Departments

Arts

Bengali
English

Accreditation 
The college is recognized by the University Grants Commission (UGC).

See also

References

External links

Universities and colleges in Birbhum district
Colleges affiliated to University of Burdwan
Educational institutions established in 2007
2007 establishments in West Bengal